Patrick Yau Tat-Chi is a Hong Kong film director and assistant director best known for making independent films for Milkyway Image, the production company owned by Johnnie To and Wai Ka-Fai.

Career
Yau joined TVB when he was 21 and became Johnnie To's assistant director two years later. He became a television producer for TVB in 1991, but left in 1994 to work for To, as an associate director for his fire-fighting film Lifeline. In 1997, Yau made his directorial debut with his first film, The Odd One Dies and continued to direct films produced by Milkyway Image, such as The Longest Nite and Expect the Unexpected. Yau has now returned to his roots, directing television serials for TVB.

Filmography

Awards and nominations

References

External links

Hong Kong film directors
Hong Kong people
Living people
1964 births